Oksana Ivanovna Yermakova (also spelled Oxana Ermakova, born 16 April 1973) is an Estonian and Russian épée fencer.

She represented Soviet Union in 1991, Estonia in 1992–1997 and Russia in 1998–2005. She won two gold medals in the team épée event at the 2000 and 2004 Summer Olympics. She competed for Estonia at the 1996 Summer Olympics.

References

External links
  (archive)
 
 
 

1973 births
Living people
Sportspeople from Tallinn
Estonian female épée fencers
Russian female épée fencers
Soviet female épée fencers
Fencers at the 1996 Summer Olympics
Fencers at the 2000 Summer Olympics
Fencers at the 2004 Summer Olympics
Olympic fencers of Russia
Olympic fencers of Estonia
Olympic gold medalists for Russia
Olympic medalists in fencing
Medalists at the 2000 Summer Olympics
Medalists at the 2004 Summer Olympics
Universiade medalists in fencing
Estonian people of Russian descent
Universiade gold medalists for Russia